Lumbrokinase is a fibrinolytic enzyme present in the earthworm Lumbricus bimastus. It is a clinically approved and proven antithrombotic agent in Asia.

References 

Antithrombotic agents